Virgilijus Kačinskas (born May 25, 1959 in Vilnius) is a Lithuanian politician.  In 1990 he was among those who signed the Act of the Re-Establishment of the State of Lithuania.

References

1959 births
Living people
Politicians from Vilnius
Vilnius Gediminas Technical University alumni